Guillermo García, is a Venezuelan actor. He is best known for telenovelas La mujer perfecta and Los hombres también lloran, and in movies such as Blue and Not So Pink and La casa del fin de los tiempos.

Filmography

Films

Television roles

References

External links 

1980 births
21st-century Venezuelan male actors
Venezuelan male telenovela actors
Venezuelan male film actors
Living people
People from Barquisimeto